The 1938 National Invitation Tournament was the 1938 edition of the annual NCAA basketball competition.  It was the inaugural National Invitational Tournament and was won by Temple.

Selected teams
Below is a list of the six teams selected for the tournament.

 Bradley
 Colorado
 Long Island
 NYU
 Oklahoma A&M
 Temple

Bracket
Below is the tournament bracket.

See also
 1938 NAIA Basketball Tournament

References

National Invitation
National Invitation Tournament
1930s in Manhattan
College sports tournaments in New York City
National Invitation Tournament
National Invitation Tournament
Basketball competitions in New York City
Sports in Manhattan